Santa Isabel is a municipality in the state of São Paulo in Brazil. It is part of the Metropolitan Region of São Paulo. The population is 57,966 (2020 est.) in an area of 363.33 km². The elevation is 655 m. It is located 60 miles east of the downtown of the city of São Paulo.

Notable People
Mauricio de Sousa: (born 1935), the creator of Turma da Mônica

History
The town of Santa Isabel was named after a Portuguese queen, Isabel or Elizabeth of Aragon (b. 1271- d. 1336), who was canonized by Pope Urban VIII in 1625. The town was founded in the 18th century, when Brazil was still a colony of Portugal.

Geography and ecology
Santa Isabel belongs to the Guarulhos macro region, thus it is part of the Greater São Paulo region as well. The municipality lies in the basins of the Rio Jaguari and the Rio Paraíba do Sul and 84% of the municipality is protected by environmental laws because of its significance as a potable water source 
The municipality contains part of the  Mananciais do Rio Paraíba do Sul Environmental Protection Area, created in 1982 to protect the sources of the Paraíba do Sul.

The area suffered ecologically from unauthorized uses and in 1996 the Ibirapitanga Reserve on the Rio dos Pilões was created to preserve one of the last stands of Brazilian Atlantic forest and to permit managed urban growth.

References

Municipalities in São Paulo (state)